The Women's team pursuit competition at the 2017 World Single Distances Speed Skating Championships was held on 10 February 2017.

Results
The race was started at 19:03.

References

Women's team pursuit
World